Waine Pryce (born ) is a former professional rugby league footballer who played as a er and also as a  in the 2000s and 2010s. He played at international level for England 'A' and Jamaica, and at club level for the Castleford Tigers, Wakefield Trinity Wildcats, Featherstone Rovers, Hunslet Hawks (two spells) and the York City Knights.

Background
Waine Pryce was born in Bradford, West Yorkshire, England, he comes from a family of rugby league footballers with his father and uncles having played professionally, he has Jamaican ancestors, and eligible to play for Jamaica due to the grandparent rule. He is the cousin of the rugby league footballer; Leon Pryce and the rugby league footballer; Karl Pryce. As of 2014 he works as a mechanical engineer.

Castleford Tigers
Waine Pryce came through the Castleford Tigers Academy system as a youngster. He made his début for the senior team in 2000. He has scored 80 tries for CastlefordTigers in 140 starting appearances. During July 2006's Super League XI, Pryce broke the tibia and fibula in his left leg away at Harlequins RL. The extent of his injury forced him to have a metal rod and screws inserted into his injured leg.

Because of the injury, Pryce missed the last two months of the 2006's Super League XI, which saw Castleford Tigers relegated. For the 2007 Super League season, Pryce was transferred from the Castleford Tigers to the Wakefield Trinity Wildcats. Then in 2008 Pryce joined former Castleford Tigers teammate Tom Saxton, and joined Featherstone Rovers.

Wakefield Trinity Wildcats
Although relegated with Castleford Tigers from the Super League competition, Wakefield Trinity Wildcats signed Waine Pryce. Although Pryce missed the first few games of the season as he was still recovering from his injury.

Waine has released by Wakefield Trinity Wildcats as he never became a regular in the first-team.

England
He has won international honours for the England 'A' side, making appearances against New Zealand, Tonga and Fiji. He has also represented England 'A' in the 2003 European Nations Cup competition.

Sources

External links
Winger Pryce makes Hunslet move
Reserves run for Waine Pryce as he eyes Knights return
Dickens' miss is costly for Rovers
Hunslet Hawks: A view from the pitch - Pryce
Boss steals a March on York
Clare aims to make most of 'shock' move to Bradford Bulls

1981 births
Living people
Black British sportspeople
Castleford Tigers players
English people of Jamaican descent
Jamaican rugby league players
English rugby league players
Featherstone Rovers players
Hunslet R.L.F.C. players
Jamaica national rugby league team players
Waine
Rugby league players from Bradford
Rugby league wingers
Wakefield Trinity players
York City Knights players